CAPTION was an annual comics convention specialising in British small press comics. It was first held in Oxford in January 1992, subsequently being held in summer each year. Loosely based on a theme, each year's event offered panels and workshops related to small press comics along with the opportunity to buy and sell them. CAPTION was last held in 2017, the 25th anniversary of the show.

CAPTION differed from other conventions by breaking down the distinction between named guests and other attendees, avoiding segregation or special treatment of guests. In addition, it prioritized the social interaction of attendees by encouraging comics creators to place their publications on the CAPTION stall, managed by a rota of volunteers.

History
CAPTION was founded in 1992 by Adrian Cox, Damian Cugley, Jeremy Dennis, and Jenni Scott. Between 1992 and 2003 CAPTION took place in the Oxford Union Society.

Ed Pinsent was an early star of CAPTION conventions, selling his Fast Fiction on his stall.

In 1993 Andy Roberts moved to Oxford, and was able to lend his considerable experience in art and design to the convention.

In 1994 Peter Pavement started selling zines from around the world as well as repackaging other small press comics, and his zine Pavement Pizza became Ground Level.

CAPTION moved venues to Wolfson College for 2004 and 2005. From 2006 to 2013 it was held at the East Oxford Community Centre.

CAPTION skipped a year in 2014. It had been planned to be held in Brighton, but a scheduling conflict with the University of Brighton forced the show to be canceled. At that point, the show announced its intention to mount future shows in a different British city each year.

CAPTION also skipped a year in 2016 before returning in December 2017 for the convention's 25th-anniversary show. 

There has not been a CAPTION show since 2017.

Dates, themes, and special guests 
 January 1992: no specific theme
 17–18 July 1993: Comics: Art or Trash? — debating the status of comics within culture
 Summer 1994: Sex & Drugs & Rock'n'Roll — guests include Hunt Emerson, Pete Loveday, and Bryan Talbot
 Summer 1995:
 Summer 1996: Lazy CAPTION
 Summer 1997: EuroCAPTION — guests include France's David B, Spain's Max, and the Netherlands' Maaike Hartjes
 Summer 1998: The Death of CAPTION
 Summer 1999: SpaceCAPTION1999 — guests include Bryan Talbot
 12–13 August 2000: You cannot kill that which is already dead
 18–19 August 2001: Love is ... CAPTION 2001
 17–18 August 2002: CAPTION Noir
 August 2003: CyberCAPTION — guests include Carla Speed McNeil
 14–15 August 2004: CAPTION is History — guests include Al Davison and Pat Mills
 30–31 July 2005: Bargain Basement CAPTION
 5–6 August 2006: CAPTION Remix
 11–12 August 2007: Dreams and Nightmares
 9–10 August 2008: Timewarp CAPTION
 15–16 August 2009: CAPTION is away with the fairies
 31 July to 1 August 2010: Mad Science
 6–7 August 2011: Austerity
 18–19 August 2012: CAPTION Summer Special
 24–25 August 2013
 10–11 October 2015 
 1–2 December 2017: 25th anniversary show

References

External links
 
 Alleged Literature by CAPTION co-founder Jeremy Dennis
CAPTION co-founder Jeremy Dennis' Cleanskies

British small press comics
British fan conventions
Defunct comics conventions
Recurring events established in 1992